The East Tasman Plateau is a submerged microcontinent south east of Tasmania. It is a circular piece of continental rocks surrounded by oceanic crust. Volcanism occurred there . This ridge runs north west from the plateau. South-west of the plateau is the L'Atalante Depression. The East Tasman Plateau represents a continental fragment.

Tectonics
Prior to tectonic rifting, the East Tasman Plateau microcontinent was attached to the southeast of Tasmania and the north east of the South Tasman Rise. To the northeast, east and south east of the plateau was the Lord Howe Rise.
In the Cretaceous period, the continental breakup of Gondwana started near Tasmania.  About  a rift entered the east coast of Tasmania from the south and split off the Lord Howe Rise from the South Tasman Rise to the west.  Sea floor spreading continued to move this continental sliver away to the east from Tasmania and Australia, and the rift jumped into the Lord Howe Rise and separated off the East Tasman Plateau. The detachment of the East Tasman Plateau from the Lord Howe Rise has left a large gulf on the west side of the Lord Howe Rise around 38°S 162°E where it used to be.

In the late Cretaceous the East Tasman Plateau was at 65°S and it moved north to 60°S in early Oligocene.

Geology
The geology of the East Tasman Plateau includes early hard continental type rocks, volcanic rocks which are part of sea mounts, and marine sediments deposited since it was below sea level.

The earliest continental East Tasman Plateau rocks that have been brought to the surface of the sea are of Neoproterozoic age, and include gneiss, rhyolite, quartzite, sandstone, ferricrete, and metamorphosed sediments.

Sediments on the East Tasman Plateau start with silty clay from Maastrichtian to Eocene. These were deposited in shallow sea water. The microfossils found in these layers include spores, pollen from coniferous forests, and dinocysts. The pollen showed that the climate was humid, with cool winters. From early to mid Eocene, 55 to 37 Ma, the climate on nearby land was uniform, wet and cool and supported angiosperm forests. During the mid Eocene microfossils include diatoms. Above this in the stratigraphic record is glauconite containing siltstone deposited at the end of the Eocene. This material was due to condensed sedimentation due to the added water from the current. After this there was a gap in the deposition, due to the opening of the Southern Ocean between the Australian Continent and Antarctica. A seaway carrying the strong Antarctic Circumpolar Current developed. The current eroded part of the surface, and stopped the sediments from the land masses from reaching it. During Oligocene to mid Miocene there were oceanic deposits of clay and calcareous ooze. Microfossils from this time include foraminifers. After this the circumpolar current strengthened and only ooze deposited.

After the deposition of sediments, the sediment has been modified by phosphatisation and the formation of ferromanganese crusts.

Paleoclimate
Carbonate-clumped isotope thermometry uses the carbon-13 and oxygen-18 isotope levels in carbonates to determine the sea temperature. This is in addition to the microfossils, which give a temperature clue as different organisms live in different water temperatures. The sediment cores from the East Tasman Plateau give a history of the temperature of the Southern Ocean and are valuable in seeing the limits of climate change in the future.

Cascade Seamount
The Cascade Seamount is an undersea mountain which has a height from its base higher than those on Tasmania. The Cascade Seamount is a volcano formed during the Late Eocene period as a result of the Balleny mantle plume. This volcano has produced volcanic breccia, hyaloclastite and alkali olivine basalt. The extra weight of the seamount isostatically depressed the adjacent plateau to form a basin. The age is confirmed by foraminifera microfossils Chiloguembelina cubensis, Globigerapsis index, Globigerapsis rubriformis, Subbotina angiporoides and Subbotina linaperta found in the sediment on the volcano. This sediment settled in shallow water.

The Cascade Seamount is part of a chain of volcanic seamounts that extend south to the Balleny Islands near Antarctica.

High frequency echograms show that the top of the seamount is covered in sediment, but that the steep slopes are rocky.  There is possibly a debris flow on the east flank.

The name for Cascade Seamount has also been called Cascade Guyot.  The feature was discovered in 1944, and appeared on chart BA214 in 1954. It was named after the Cascade Brewery.

Fauna
Above the sea at this location typical Southern Ocean animals are found such as several kinds of whales, albatross and petrels. Species detected include Diomedea exulans, Diomedea royal, Diomedea sanfordi, Euphausia frigida, Fregetta tropica, Limacina retroversa, Oceanites oceanicus, Oithona similis, Pachyptila belcheri, Pachyptila crassirostris, Pachyptila turtur, Pachyptila vittata, Pelagodroma marina, Phoebetria fusca, Phoebetria palpebrata, Procellaria aequinoctialis, Pterodroma cookilaria, Pterodroma lessonii, Pterodroma leucoptera, Pterodroma macroptera, Pterodroma macroptera, Pterodroma mollis, Pterodroma neglecta, Puffinus assimilis, Puffinus tenuirostris, Thalassarche bulleri, Thalassarche cauta, Thalassarche melanophrys, and Thysanoessa macrura.

Molluscs found on the Cascade Seamount include Cuspidaria brazieri (Brazier’s spoon-shell), Cuspidaria erma (noble spoon-shell), Veprichlamys perillustris (shining scallop), Fusitriton magellanicus retiolus (Magellanic rock-whelk), and Sassia kampyla (curved rock-whelk). The deep water sea star Novodinia australis has been found on the Cascade Seamount.

References

Extra reading

 explanation of formation

Cretaceous geology
Plate tectonics
Continental fragments
Plateaus of the Pacific Ocean
Underwater ridges of the Pacific Ocean
Cretaceous paleogeography
Seamounts of the Tasman Sea